Oberea hebescens is a species of beetle in the family Cerambycidae. It was described by Henry Walter Bates in 1873.

References

hebescens
Beetles described in 1873